Shahin Jamie (born in Rasht, Iran) is an Iranian actor.

Biography

Shahin Jamie began acting at age 6. His first appearance on stage took place in 1985, when he played his first comedic role. He graduated from high school during the Iran and Iraq war and a year after joined a troupe who was entertaining Iranian military soldiers; as an actor and then as a writer and director of comedy plays. After the war he start acting on stage in both comedic and dramatic plays. Jamie left Iran for Turkey in 1996, and in September 2000 he emigrated to the United States.

Works

 Played in A Window To See written by Farhad Pakseresht and directed by Reza Mirmanavi.  
 Started a comedy show for Persian satellite Melli TV, and hosted the show Labkhande Sabz until 2008. 
 Started the show, Stop Sign, at jam-e-jam TV, that is ongoing. Stop Sign pokes fun at Iranian diplomats, singers, and the government. 
 In 2007-2008 wrote a comedic play Gol-e Niloofar (Water Lily).
 In 2010 played in the comedic movie 2 Dareh.
In 2013 he played main role in a funny play by Farzan Deljou Ganj-e Gharoon. 
In 2014 he wrote and directed funniest Iranian comedy play HOTEL. 
In 2015 he made another funny and successful comedy play Khar-too-khar. 
In 2016 he mad largest comedy play in Iranian society ever Aroosi with a large crow of casting 
And this summer he is preparing and is on a pre production for another hilarious comedy on stage BALCONY
Balcony was the most successful play in last 3 decade in iranian society. More than 50 performance in less than 8 months in the U.S tells us how popular was the show. After a big credit for Balcony, Shahin started a new project.He decide to touch a very interesting part of iranian history. The Harem of Nassereddin Shah. After a long time research he end up with a story named "Otor Khan Rashti". In  early 2020 he took the play on stage.

References

Iranian male television actors
Iranian male stage actors
Living people
Year of birth missing (living people)
People from Rasht